The Integral Molten Salt Reactor (IMSR) is a nuclear power plant design targeted at developing a commercial product for the small modular reactor (SMR) market. It employs molten salt reactor technology which is being developed by the Canadian company Terrestrial Energy.
It is based closely on the denatured molten salt reactor (DMSR), a reactor design from Oak Ridge National Laboratory. It also incorporates elements found in the SmAHTR, a later design from the same laboratory. 
The IMSR belongs to the DMSR class of molten salt reactors (MSR) and hence is a "burner" reactor that employs a liquid fuel rather than a conventional solid fuel; this liquid contains the nuclear fuel and also serves as primary coolant.

In 2016, Terrestrial Energy engaged in a pre-licensing design review for the IMSR with the Canadian Nuclear Safety Commission and entered the second phase of this process in October 2018 after successfully completing the first stage in late 2017.
The company claims it will have its first commercial IMSRs licensed and operating in the 2020s.

Design

The Integral Molten Salt Reactor integrates into a compact, sealed and replaceable nuclear reactor unit, called the IMSR Core-unit. The core-unit comes in a single size designed to deliver 440 megawatts of thermal heat which can be used for multiple applications. If used to generate electricity then the notional capacity is 195 megawatts electrical. The unit include all the primary components of the nuclear reactor that operate on the liquid molten fluoride salt fuel: moderator, primary heat exchangers, pumps and shutdown rods.The Core-unit forms the heart of the IMSR system. In the Core-unit, the fuel salt is circulated between the graphite core and heat exchangers. The Core-unit itself is placed inside a surrounding vessel called the guard vessel. The entire Core-unit module can be lifted out for replacement. The guard vessel that surrounds the Core-unit acts as a containment vessel. In turn, a shielded silo surrounds the guard vessel.

The IMSR belongs to the denatured molten salt reactor (DMSR) class of molten salt reactors (MSR). 
It is designed to have all the safety features associated with the Molten Salt class of reactors including low pressure operation (the reactor and primary coolant is operated near normal atmospheric pressure), the inability to lose primary coolant (the fuel is the coolant), the inability to suffer a meltdown accident (the fuel operates in an already molten state) and the robust chemical binding of the fission products within the primary coolant salt (reduced pathway for accidental release of fission products).

The design uses standard assay low-enriched uranium fuel, with less than 5% U235 with a simple converter (also known as a "burner") fuel cycle objective (as do most operating power reactors today). The proposed fuel is in the form of uranium tetrafluoride (UF4) blended with carrier salts. These salts are also fluorides, such as lithium fluoride (LiF), sodium fluoride (NaF) and/or beryllium fluoride (BeF2). These carrier salts increase the heat capacity of the fuel and lower the fuel's melting point. 

The fuel salt blend also acts as the primary coolant for the reactor.

The IMSR is a thermal-neutron reactor moderated by vertical graphite tubular elements. 
The molten salt fuel-coolant mixture flows upward through these tubular elements where it goes critical. 
After heating up in this moderated core the liquid fuel flows upward through a central common chimney and is then pulled downward by pumps through heat exchanges positioned inside the reactor vessel. 
The liquid fuel then flow down the outer edge of the reactor core to repeat the cycle. 
All the primary components, heat exchangers, pumps etc. are positioned inside the reactor vessel. 
The reactor’s integrated architecture avoids the use of external piping for the fuel that could leak or break.

The piping external to the reactor vessel contain two additional salt loops in series: a secondary, nonradioactive coolant salt, followed by another (third) coolant salt. 
These salt loops act as additional barriers to any radionuclides and improve the system's heat capacity. It also allows easier integration with the heat sink end of the plant; either process heat or power applications using standard industrial grade steam turbine plants are envisioned by Terrestrial Energy.

The IMSR Core-unit is designed to be completely replaced after a 7-year period of operation. This ensures that a sufficient operational lifetime of materials used in the IMSR reactor core can be achieved. During  operation, small fresh fuel/salt batches are periodically added to the reactor system. This online refueling process does not require the mechanical refueling machinery required for solid fuel reactor systems.

Many of these design features are based on two previous molten salt designs from Oak Ridge National Laboratory (ORNL) – the ORNL denatured molten salt reactor (DMSR) from 1980 and the solid fuel/liquid salt cooled, small modular advanced high temperature reactor (SmAHTR), a 2010 design. The DMSR, as carried into the IMSR design, proposed to use molten salt fuel and graphite moderator in a simplified converter design using LEU , with periodic additions of LEU fuel. Most previous proposals for molten salt reactors all bred more fuel than needed to operate, so were called breeders. Converter or "burner" reactors like the IMSR and DMSR can also utilize plutonium from existing spent fuel as their makeup fuel source. The more recent SmAHTR proposal was for a small, modular, molten salt cooled but solid TRISO fuelled reactor.

Replaceable Core-unit
The design uses a replaceable Core-unit. When the graphite moderator's lifetime exposure to neutron flux causes it to start distorting beyond acceptable limits, rather than remove and replace the graphite moderator, the entire IMSR Core-unit is replaced as a unit. This includes the pumps, pump motors, shutdown rods, heat exchangers and graphite moderator, all of which are either inside the vessel or directly attached to it. To facilitate a replacement, the design employs two reactor silos in the reactor building, one operating and one idle or with a previous, empty, spent Core-unit in cool-down. After 7 years of operation, the core-unit is shut down and cools in place to allow short lived radionuclides to decay. After that cool-down period, the spent core-unit is lifted out and eventually replaced.

Simultaneously, a new Core-unit is installed and activated in the second silo. This entails connection to the secondary (coolant) salt piping, placement of the containment head and biological shield and loading with fresh fuel salt. The containment head provides double containment (the first being the sealed reactor vessel itself). The new Core-unit can now start its 7 years of power operations.

The IMSR vendor accumulates sealed, spent IMSR Core-units and spent fuel salt tanks in onsite, below grade silos. This operational mode reduces uncertainties with respect to long service life of materials and equipment, replacing them by design rather than allowing age-related issues such as creep or corrosion to accumulate.

Online refueling 
The IMSR employs online fueling. While operating, small fresh fuel salt batches are periodically added to the reactor system. As the reactor uses circulating liquid fuel this process does not require complex mechanical refueling machinery. The reactor vessel is never opened, thereby ensuring a clean operating environment. During the 7 years, no fuel is removed from the reactor; this differs from solid fuel reactors which must remove fuel to make room for any new fuel assemblies, limiting fuel utilization.

Safety
Nuclear power reactors have three fundamental safety requirements: control, cooling, and containment.

Control 
Nuclear reactors require control over the critical nuclear chain reaction. As such, the design must provide for exact control over the reaction rate of the core, and must enable reliable shut-down when needed. Under routine operations, the IMSR relies on intrinsic stability for reactivity control; there are no control rods. This behavior is known as negative power feedback - the reactor is self-stabilizing in power output and temperature, and is characterized as a load-following reactor. Reactor power is controlled by the amount of heat removed from the reactor: increased heat removal results in a drop in fuel salt temperature, resulting in increased reactivity and in turn increased power. Conversely, reducing heat removal will increase reactor temperature at first, lowering reactivity and subsequently reducing reactor power. If all heat removal is lost, the reactor power will drop to a very low power level.

As backup (and shutdown method for maintenance), the IMSR employs shutdown rods filled with neutron absorber. These rods are normally held out of the critical region by the upward pressure of the pumped salt in circulation but will drop into place to stop criticality if pumped circulation is lost due to a power outage or pump failure.

As with other molten salt reactors, the reactor can also be shut down by draining the fuel salt from the Core-unit into storage tanks.

A failsafe backup is provided in the form of meltable cans, filled with a liquid neutron absorbing material that will permanently shut down the reactor in the event of a severe overheating event.

Cooling 

A nuclear reactor is a thermal power system—it generates heat, transports it and eventually converts it to mechanical energy in a heat engine, in this case a steam turbine. 
Such systems require that the heat is removed, transported and converted at the same rate it is generated.

A fundamental issue for nuclear reactors is that even when the nuclear fission process is halted, heat continues to be generated at significant levels by the radioactive decay of the fission products for days and even months. 
This is known as decay heat and is the major safety driver behind the cooling of nuclear reactors, because this decay heat must be removed. 
For conventional light water reactors the flow of cooling water must continue in all foreseeable circumstances, otherwise damage and melting of the (solid) fuel can result. 
Light water reactors operate with a volatile coolant, requiring high pressure operation and depressurization in an emergency.

The IMSR instead uses liquid fuel at low pressure. 
IMSR does not rely on bringing coolant to the reactor or depressurizing the reactor, using instead passive cooling. 
Heat continuously dissipates from the Core-unit. 
During normal operation, heat loss is reduced by the moderate temperature of the reactor vessel in normal operation, combined with the stagnant air between the Core-unit and guard vessel, which only allows radiant heat transfer. Radiant heat transfer is a strong function of temperature; any increase in the temperature of the Core-unit will rapidly increase heat loss. 
Upon shutdown of the primary salt pumps, the reactor passively drops power to a very small level. 
It can still heat up slowly by the small but constant decay heat as previously described. Due to the large heat capacity of the graphite and the salts, this increase in temperature is slow. 
The higher temperatures slowly increase thermal radiant heat loss, and subsequent heat loss from the guard vessel itself to the outside air. 
Low pressure nitrogen flows by natural convection over the outside of the guard vessel, transporting heat to the metal reactor building roof. 
This roof provides the passive heat loss required, acting as a giant radiator to the outside air. 
As a result, heat loss is increased while decay heat naturally drops; an equilibrium is reached where temperatures peak and then drop. 
The thermal dynamics and inertia of the entire system of the Core-unit in its containment silo is sufficient to absorb and disperse decay heat. 
In the long term, as decay heat dissipates almost completely, and the plant is still not recovered, the reactor would increase power to the level of the heat loss to the internal reactor vessel auxiliary cooling system (IRVACS), and stay at that low power level (and normal temperature) indefinitely.

In the event that the low pressure nitrogen coolant leaks from the IRVACS then natural air will offer similar cooling capability. Albeit with a minor nuclear activation of the argon in the air.

The molten salts are excellent heat transfer fluids, with volumetric heat capacities close to water, and good thermal conductivity.

Containment 
All molten salt reactors have features that contribute to containment safety. These mostly have to do with the properties of the salt itself. The salts are chemically inert. They do not burn and are not combustible. The salts have low volatility (high boiling point around 1400 °C), allowing a low operating pressure of the core and cooling loops. This provides a large margin above the normal operating temperature of some 600 to 700 °C. This makes it possible to operate at low pressures without risk of coolant/fuel boiling (an issue with water cooled reactors).

The high chemical stability of the salt precludes energetic chemical reactions such as hydrogen gas generation/detonation and sodium combustion, that can challenge the design and operations of other reactor types. The fluoride salt reacts with many fission products to produce chemically stable, non-volatile fluorides, such as cesium fluoride. Similarly, the majority of other high risk fission products such as iodine, dissolve into the fuel salt, bound up as iodide salts.  However, for the MSRE "of the order of
one-fourth to one-third of the iodine has not been
adequately accounted for.". There is some uncertainty as to whether this is a measurement error, as the concentrations are small and other fission products also had similar accounting problems. See liquid fluoride thorium reactor and molten salt reactor for more information.

The IMSR also has multiple physical containment barriers. It uses a sealed, integral reactor unit, the Core-unit. The Core-unit is surrounded by the guard vessel on its side and bottom, itself surrounded by a gas-tight structural steel and concrete silo. The Core-unit is covered up from the top by a steel containment head which is itself covered by thick round steel and concrete plates. The plates serve as radiation shield and provide protection against external hazards such as explosions or aircraft crash penetration. The reactor building provides an additional layer of protection against such external hazards, as well as a controlled, filtered-air confinement area.

Most molten salt reactors use a gravity drain tank as an emergency storage reservoir for the molten fuel salt. The IMSR deliberately avoids this drain tank. The IMSR design is simpler and eliminates the bottom drain line and accompanying risks from low level vessel penetrations. The result is a more compact, robust design with fewer parts and few failure scenarios. The salt can however be drained from the reactor by pumping it out the top.

Relative to light water reactors the scale and capital cost of the containment building is significantly reduced as there is no need to deal with the phase change risk associated with a water based coolant.

Economics 

The economics of conventional nuclear reactors are dominated by the capital cost—the cost to build and finance the construction of the facility. Uranium costs are relatively low however conventional fuel fabrication is a significant cost of operation.

Due to the dominance of capital cost, most nuclear power reactors have sought to reduce cost per Watt by increasing the total power output of the reactor system. However, this often leads to very large projects that are difficult to finance, manage and to standardize.

Terrestrial Energy is arguing for a different approach: to produce a more compact, more efficient reactor system, with a safety case that relies more on physics than engineered systems. And a fuel system that avoids complex fabrication processes.

As molten salts have a low vapor pressure and high heat volumetric heat capacity the reactor and containment can be compact and low pressure. This allows for more modularity in construction.

The higher operating temperature with molten salts improves thermodynamic efficiency. The IMSR produces around 40% more electricity than a comparably sized water-cooled SMR. The result is around 40% more revenue from the same reactor size. This has a large impact on economics. The design also extracts more energy from the same quantity of fuel before it is considered “spent”.

Safety Approach 
A large part of the cost of nuclear power reactors is related to safety and the resulting quality and regulatory requirements that can drive costs up. 
The IMSR approach is to rely on inherent and passive safety features rather than complex active systems, potentially reducing costs in this important area, while increasing the safety profile.

For control, inherent reactor power control by reactivity feedback, rather than a reactor control system with actively positioning control rods is used.
For cooling, the always-on, passive cooling system based on heat loss, enabling safety-grade decay heat removal. Unlike conventional reactors the IMSR decay cooling mechanism does not require backup electric power. 
For containment, the salt properties provide a key difference with water-cooled reactors. The salts have low vapor pressures and high boiling points, and are chemically stable. High pressures and hydrogen threats are thereby eliminated from the containment design, reducing the required containment volume, design pressure, and attendant costs. The high cesium retention of the salt reduces the available source term in an accident, further reducing the fundamental risk profile.

Efficiency 
Conventional nuclear reactors, such as pressurized and boiling water reactors, use water as a coolant. Due to water's high vapor pressure at elevated temperatures, they are limited to operating at a relatively low temperature, usually near 300 °C. This limits the thermodynamic efficiency, typically to around 32-34%. In other words, water-cooled power reactors generate 32-34 watts of electricity for every 100 watts of reactor power.

The higher thermal stability and low vapor pressure of the salt allows operation at higher temperatures. IMSR provides final heat at temperatures of around 550-600 °C, which results in an efficiency in the 45-48% range.
The IMSR produces around 1.4 times more electricity per unit reactor heat output compared to conventional commercial reactors. Thus it generates some 40% more revenues from the same reactor power. This has a large impact on the project economics. In addition, the higher temperature of the IMSR allows for the use of more compact, lower-cost turbine systems, already in common use with coal fired power stations, as opposed to conventional nuclear power plants that usually need specialized low-temperature turbines that are not used anywhere else. This helps to further lower the capital cost.

Nuclear efficiency - the amount of nuclear fuel used per unit electricity generated. Whilst uranium is relatively cheap fuel costs in a traditional nuclear facility are significant due to the high cost of fuel fabrication. The IMSR avoids most of the expensive fabrication process and as such the fuel cost is expected to be negligible.

Modularity 

A key cost driver is in the nature of the equipment used. Standardized, manufactured components are lower cost than specialized, or even custom components.

Molten salts have high volumetric heat capacity, a low vapor pressure and no hydrogen generation potential, so there is no need for large-volume, high-pressure vessels for the reactor and containment or other equipment areas. This reduces the size of the Core-unit and containment compared to water-cooled reactors. Similarly, molten salt heat exchangers used are more compact than the large steam generators employed in PWRs.

The compact Core-unit forms the basic modularity of the IMSR system. Core-units are identical and small enough to be fabricated in a controlled in-door environment.

Reactor Pressure 

High pressure is a cost driver for any component, as it increases both quality requirements and required materials (thickness). Large, high pressure components require heavy weldings and forgings that have limited availability. A typical operating pressure for a pressurized water reactor (PWR) is over 150 atmospheres. For the IMSR, due to the low vapor pressure and high boiling point of the salt, the Core-unit operates at or near atmospheric pressure (other than a few atmospheres of pressure from the hydrostatic weight of the salt). This is despite the higher operating temperature. The results is lighter, thinner components that are easier to manufacture and modularize.

Other Markets 

Various non-electric applications exist that have a large market demand for energy: steam reforming, paper and pulp production, chemicals and plastics, etc. Water-cooled conventional reactors are unsuitable to most of these markets due to the low operating temperature of around 300 °C, and too large in size to match single point industrial heat needs. The IMSR's smaller size and higher operating temperature (around 700 °C in the reactor, up to 600 °C delivered) could potentially open up new markets in these process heat applications. In addition, cogeneration, the production of both heat and electricity, are also potentially attractive.

Licensing
Terrestrial Energy was founded in Canada in 2013 with the objective of commercialising the IMSR, and is currently working to license (in both Canada and the USA) an IMSR design with a thermal power capacity of 400 MW (equivalent to 190 MW electrical). 
As standard industrial grade steam turbines are proposed, cogeneration, or combined heat and power, is also possible.

In 2016, Terrestrial Energy engaged in a pre-licensing design review for the IMSR with the  Canadian Nuclear Safety Commission (CNSC). 
It successfully completed the first stage of this process in late 2017, and entered the second phase of the design review in October 2018.
Terrestrial Energy claims it will have its first commercial IMSRs licensed and operating in the 2020s.

On August 15, 2019,  (CNSC) and the United States Nuclear Regulatory Commission signed a joint memorandum of cooperation (MOC) aimed at enhancing technical reviews of advanced reactor and small modular reactor technologies.  As part of the MOC, the agencies undertook in May 2022 a joint review of Terrestrial Energy’s Postulated Initiating Events (PIE) analysis and methodology for the IMSR® This work is foundational for further regulatory safety reviews and the regulatory program to prepare license applications required to operate IMSR® plants in Canada and the United States.

See also

References

Further reading

Nuclear power
Nuclear power reactor types
Molten salt reactors